The 19th Senate district of Wisconsin is one of 33 districts in the Wisconsin State Senate.  Located in east-central Wisconsin, the district comprises northern Winnebago County and southwest Outagamie County.  It includes most of the city of Appleton, as well as the cities of Menasha and Neenah, roughly constituting the western half of the "Fox Cities".

Current elected officials
Rachael Cabral-Guevara is the senator representing the 19th district since January 2023.  She previously served in the State Assembly, representing the 55th Assembly district from 2021 to 2023.

Each Wisconsin State Senate district is composed of three State Assembly districts.  The 19th Senate district comprises the 55th, 56th, and 57st Assembly districts. The current representatives of those districts are: 
 Assembly District 55: Nate Gustafson (R–Fox Crossing)
 Assembly District 56: David Murphy (R–Greenville)
 Assembly District 57: Lee Snodgrass (D–Appleton)

The 19th Senate district, in its current borders, crosses two congressional districts.  The portion of Appleton in Winnebago County, as well as the cities of Menasha and Neenah, fall within Wisconsin's 6th congressional district, which is represented by U.S. Representative Glenn Grothman; the remainder of the district in north-central Winnebago County and Outagamie County fall within Wisconsin's 8th congressional district, which is represented by U.S. Representative Mike Gallagher.

Past senators
Past senators include:

Note: the boundaries of districts have changed repeatedly over history. Previous politicians of a specific numbered district have represented a completely different geographic area, due to redistricting.

Notes

External links
District Website

Wisconsin State Senate districts
Outagamie County, Wisconsin
Winnebago County, Wisconsin
1848 establishments in Wisconsin